Kuemper is a surname. Notable people with the surname include:

Darcy Kuemper (born 1990), Canadian professional ice hockey goaltender
Jared Kuemper, Canadian record producer

See also
Kuemper Catholic School System, in Iowa